Gwendoline Gaelle Sandrine Ramos Ruais (born December 11, 1989) is a Filipino-French actress, model, TV presenter and beauty pageant titleholder who was crowned Miss World Philippines 2011. She represented the Philippines at the Miss World 2011 pageant in London, England and placed 1st Runner-Up.

Biography
Ruais was born to a French father and a Filipino mother. She has a Business Management Honors degree from Sunderland University. Ruais has a sister who is also a beauty queen, Gwennaelle Ruais, who competed in Miss Philippines Earth 2010 and finished as the 3rd Runner-Up. Both sisters are the granddaughters of Pierre Ruais, who was the mayor of Paris between 1956 and 1957.

Pageantry

Binibining Pilipinas 2010
Ruais first joined Binibining Pilipinas 2010 and placed as a top 10 semifinalist. The eventual winners were (Binibining Pilipinas International 2010) Krista Kleiner, (Binibining Pilipinas World 2010) Czarina Gatbonton, and (Binibining Pilipinas Universe 2010) Venus Raj.

Miss World Philippines 2011
Ruais joined the first edition of CQGQ's Miss World Philippines in 2011 where she was victorious. She was crowned by Miss World 2010 Alexandra Mills in the Philippine International Convention Center in Pasay on 18 September 2011. She represented the Philippines in the Miss World 2011 pageant.

On June 24, 2012, Ruais crowned Queenierich Rehman as her successor at the Miss World Philippines 2012 pageant held at the Manila Hotel in Manila, Philippines.

Miss World 2011
In the Miss World finals night, Ruais was crowned as the 1st Runner-Up, with Ivian Sarcos of Venezuela being crowned as the winner. This was the Philippines' highest placement in Miss World since Evangeline Pascual placed as 1st runner-up in 1973 and Ruffa Gutierrez, who placed as 2nd runner-up in 1993.

Career
After Miss World 2011, Ruais became a regular performer at Party Pilipinas and a host for Unang Hirit on GMA Network in 2012. She then went on to be a host and judge on the reality show Gusto Ko Maging Beauty Queen (I want to be a beauty queen) and continued with various stints on TV shows and movies.

After winning in the international pageant, the Miss World Organization called her back to be the pageant reporter for the Miss World 2013 in Bali.

She did not just host Miss World, up to this date she has been the yearly host of the Miss World Philippines pageant, and aside from hosting the televised coronation night, every year she also mentors and trains the new candidates in catwalk, grace and question & answer.

Asia's Next Top Model
In 2016, Ruais was chosen as one of the final fourteen contestants for the fourth season of Asia's Next Top Model. During her stay on the show, Ruais was heavily criticized for her background in pageantry. She was originally eliminated during the show's first episode, but was allowed to remain in the competition. She placed 11th overall.

Filmography

Television

References

External links
Official Website

Living people
Binibining Pilipinas contestants
Filipino female models
Filipino people of French descent
French female models
Miss World Philippines winners
Miss World 2011 delegates
Top Model contestants
People of Breton descent
People from Muntinlupa
1989 births